The subatomic scale is the domain of physical size that encompasses objects smaller than an atom. It is the scale at which the atomic constituents, such as the nucleus containing protons and neutrons, and the electrons in their orbitals, become apparent.

The subatomic scale includes the many thousands of times smaller subnuclear scale, which is the scale of physical size at which constituents of the protons and neutrons - particularly quarks - become apparent.

See also 

 Astronomical scale the opposite end of the spectrum

Subatomic particles